Mario Marcus Walsh (born 19 January 1966) is an English former professional footballer who played as a forward.

Career
Born in Paddington, Walsh played in Football League for Torquay, Colchester and Southend United, before returning to Colchester now in the Football Conference. After one season, he joined Redbridge Forest

Honours

Club
Colchester United
 Football Conference Runner-up (1): 1990–91

References

External links
 
 Mario Walsh at Colchester United Archive Database
 http://mariowalsh.wordpress.com

1966 births
Living people
Footballers from Paddington
English footballers
Association football forwards
Portsmouth F.C. players
Torquay United F.C. players
Colchester United F.C. players
Southend United F.C. players
Redbridge Forest F.C. players